Daddy Duck is a 1948 animated short film featuring Donald Duck.  It was released by Walt Disney Productions.

Plot
Donald Duck adopts a baby kangaroo and tries to give him take a bath.  The lady at the adoption bureau is on the telephone with him giving him instructions. After they get through that, the kangaroo gets scared by a rug made of a bear skin.

Voice cast
Clarence Nash as Donald Duck
Bea Benaderet as Adoption Bureau

Home media
The short was released on December 11, 2007 on Walt Disney Treasures: The Chronological Donald, Volume Three: 1947-1950.

References

External links
 
 

1948 films
1948 animated films
1940s Disney animated short films
Donald Duck short films
Films produced by Walt Disney
Films scored by Oliver Wallace